Ongole is a city in Prakasam district of the Indian state of Andhra Pradesh. It is the headquarters of Prakasam district and also the mandal headquarters of Ongole mandal in Ongole revenue division. Ongole cattle, an indigenous breed of oxen, derived its name from Ongole.

Etymology 
Prakasam district was formerly called Ongole district and later, renamed to Prakasam in order to pay homage to the great patriot and ex-chief minister Tanguturi Prakasam Panthulu.

History 
The town's history dates from 230 BCE with the era of the Mauryas and Satavahanas who ruled most of what is now Andhra Pradesh. A few inscriptions dating to the Satavahana period have been found in the village China Ganjam, near Ongole. After the Satavahanas, this place came into the limelight again during the Kakatiya dynasty, when the nearby towns of Motupalli and Voda Revu served as major seaports. Ongole is also mentioned in the inscriptions of the Pallava rulers of the third and fourth century A.D.

The city was also ruled by Krishna Deva Raya. The last dynasty to rule the Ongole region before the British was the Mandapati dynasty (zamindars). According to the historical inscriptions available at Sri Raja Rajeswara Swami Temple complex in Ongole City was constructed by Cholas. Kaasi Visweswara Swami temple, Chenna Keswva Swami Temple and Veeranjaneya Swami temple were built in the early 17th century by King Vankayalapati mantri and Army Chief.

Ongole district came into existence on 02-02-1970 with the carving out portions of Markapur revenue division from Kurnool, Ongole revenue division from Guntur and Kandukur revenue division from Nellore districts. It was renamed as Prakasam district in 1972 in memory of the eminent freedom fighter, later Chief Minister of the composite Madras State and the first Chief Minister of Andhra Pradesh State, late Andhra Kesari Sri Tanguturi Prakasam Panthulu, who was born at Vinodarayuni palem, a hamlet of Kanuparthi village of Naguluppala Padu Mandal of this district.

Geography 
Ongole is located at 15.5°N 80.05°E. It has an average elevation of 10 m (33 ft) AMSL and is situated on the plains. The city is around 15.54miles to the west of the Bay of Bengal on the east coast of India.

Climate 
The winter season (from November/ to February) is the most enjoyable with a pleasant climate. Winter months are usually dry, with little to no rainfall. The average annual temperature is 24.5 C. Cyclones may occur any time of the year, but occur more commonly October–December.

Demographics 
 2011 Census of India, the city had a population of 208,344. The sex ratio of 994 females per 1000 males, higher than the national average of 940 per 1000. 19,744 children are in the age group of 0–6 years, of which 10,228 are boys and 9,516 are girls&a ratio of 935 per 1000. The average literacy rate stands at 83.04% with 153,628 literates, significantly higher than the state average of 67.41%.

Governance

Civic administration and politics 

The Ongole Municipal Corporation administers the civic needs of the city, constituted as a municipality in 1876 and was upgraded to municipal corporation on 25 January 2012. The agglomerated villages that were merged into Ongole corporation are: Cheruvukommupalem, Throvagunta, Muktinuthalapadu, Dsarajupalli, Koppolu, Narasapuram Agraharam, Pellur, Pernamitta, Vengamukkapalem. Kathamaneni Sakunthala is the commissioner of the municipal corporation.

Ongole assembly constituency represents Andhra Pradesh Legislative Assembly and its also a segment of Ongole Lok Sabha constituency, representing the Lok Sabha in Indian general elections. Balineni Srinivasa Reddy is the present MLA of the constituency from YSR Congress Party. The constituency is a part of Ongole (Lok Sabha constituency) which was won by Magunta Sreenivasulu Reddy of YSR Congress Party.

Economy 

Agriculture is the primary industry of Ongole, and the city is a major center for tobacco trading in Andhra Pradesh.

Export of oxen

Ongole bulls are a breed of oxen that are exported to many countries. The Brahman bull in America is an off-breed of the Ongole. Ongole Island, in Malaysia, holds many Ongole oxen. The population of Ongole off-breed animals in Brazil is said to be around several millions. The original breed of Ongole stud bulls are found in a small region around Ongole town between the Gundlakamma and Musi rivers.

Transport 

The city is connected by road to major destinations. National Highway 16, a part of Golden Quadrilateral highway network, bypasses the city. National Highway 216 connects the city with Kathipudi. Ongole bus station is owned and operated by Andhra Pradesh State Road Transport Corporation. The station is also equipped with a bus depot for storage and maintenance of buses. The 'Passengers delight project' was implemented at the bus station for improving cleanliness and modernizing it. Ongole railway station is categorized as a Non-Suburban Grade-3 (NSG-3) station in the Vijayawada railway division.

Education 
The primary and secondary school education is imparted by government, aided and private schools of the School Education Department of the state. Instruction in the schools is given in English and Telugu. The Rajiv Gandhi Institute of Medical Sciences (RIMS) is a medical college in Ongole. Some of the famous educational institutes include RIMS, QIS College of Engineering and Technology, QIS Institute of Technology, RISE Groups of Institutions, Indira Priyadarshini Law College, Prakasam Engineering College, and the Pace Institute of Technology and Sciences.

Sports 

The PDCA-CSR Sarma College Ground is one of the home grounds of the Andhra cricket team, with a first-class cricket status and hosts Ranji Trophy matches. The ground has recorded the first ever triple century by a wicket keeper in Ranji Trophy, achieved by Srikar Bharat of the Andhra cricket team. The police parade grounds hosted the first state-level Girl Football Tournament in October 2016.

See also 
 List of cities in Andhra Pradesh by population
 List of municipal corporations in Andhra Pradesh

References

External links 

 
Articles containing potentially dated statements from 2011
All articles containing potentially dated statements
Cities in Andhra Pradesh
Mandal headquarters in Prakasam district
District headquarters of Andhra Pradesh